The 2022 UCI Para-cycling Road World Championships is the World Championships for road cycling for athletes with a physical disability. The championships took place in Baie-Comeau in Canada from 11 to 14 August 2022.

Medalists

Men's events

Women's events

Mixed events

Medal table

Participating nations 
243 cyclists from 37 nations.

References

External links 
Union Cycliste Internationale

UCI Para-cycling Road World Championships
World Para-cycling Championships
UCI Para-cycling Road World Championships
International cycle races hosted by Canada
UCI